Šišljavić   is a village in Croatia. It is connected by the D36 highway.  there were 714 inhabitants.

Populated places in Karlovac County